The common cold, or simply the cold, is a viral infectious disease of the upper respiratory tract. The cold is indeed common, and is a significant cause for absences from work and school. Even before the discovery of vitamin C, folklore had it that certain fruits were effective in both preventing and treating the cold. After scientific identification of vitamin C in the early part of the 20th century, research began into the possible effects of the vitamin against the common cold. Vitamin C does not decrease the frequency of colds in the general population, but it has halved the frequency of colds in people under heavy short-term physical stress. There is no effect of taking vitamin C in doses up to 8 grams per day after a cold has already begun.

Background
Vitamin C was identified in the early part of the twentieth century, and there was much interest in its possible effects on various infections including the common cold. A few controlled trials on the effect of vitamin C on the common cold were carried out in the 1940s. The earliest of these appears to be a placebo-controlled trial published in 1945. The topic became particularly popular after 1970 when Linus Pauling, a double Nobel laureate, wrote a best-selling book, Vitamin C and the Common Cold, advocating that a daily dose of one gram of vitamin C could prevent the common cold. Pauling's book led to great interest in the topic among lay people, and also among academic circles. After Pauling's book, a number of controlled trials were carried out. However, interest lessened after the middle of the 1970s, due to the publication of two reviews and one primary study which all concluded that vitamin C does not influence the common cold.

Research
According to the most recently published Cochrane review on vitamin C and the common cold, one gram per day or more of vitamin C does not influence common cold incidence in the general community, i.e., it does not prevent colds. However, in trials with participants who were under heavy short-term physical stress—specifically marathon runners, skiers, and soldiers in subarctic conditions, vitamin C halved the incidence of colds. The same review reported that for people who took vitamin C on a regular basis, the vitamin shortened the duration of colds in adults by 8% and in children by 18%. Severity was also reduced. However,
if vitamin C was started only when the first symptoms of a cold were being felt, there were no benefits for duration or severity.

See also
 Vitamin C megadosage
 Vitamin C review, Linus Pauling Institute, Oregon State University

References

Vitamin C
Common cold